Alex & Co. is an Italian television sitcom which first aired on Disney Channel Italy on May 11, 2015. The series was created by Marina Efron Versiglia, and stars Leonardo Cecchi, Eleonora Gaggero, Beatrice Vendramin, Saul Nanni, and Federico Russo.

Series overview

Episode list 

 All episodes were directed by Claudio Norza unless otherwise noted.

Season 1 (2015) (Music Speaks)

Season 2 (2015) Unbelievable

Season 3 (2016–2017)

Specials 
 Four special episodes aired in June 2017, marking the end of the series. These episodes aren't going to be airing in the UK.

References 

Lists of Disney Channel television series episodes
Lists of Italian television series episodes